The Fiat G.212 was an Italian three-engine airliner of the 1940s. An enlarged development of Fiat's earlier G.12 transport, it was used in small numbers in commercial service and by the Italian Air Force.

Development and design
The first prototype of the G.212, the G.212CA military transport, flew on 19 January 1947. While very similar in configuration to the G.12, i.e. a low-wing all-metal cantilever monoplane with a retractable tailwheel undercarriage, the G.212 was longer, and had a larger wing and a wider fuselage. It was powered by three 642 kW (860 hp) Alfa Romeo 128 radial engines.

It was followed by two versions intended for civil use, the G.212CP airliner, with accommodation for 34 passengers, and the G.212TP freighter, both using the more powerful Pratt & Whitney R-1830 Twin Wasp engines.

Operational history
The G.212CP entered service with Avio Linee Italiane ("Italian Airlines"), which ordered six, in 1947, being operated on routes within Europe. On thursday 1 July 1948 I-ELSA, a flight from Milano to Brussels crashed near Keerbergen airfield (eight people died). One of the surviving crewmembers died six months later in the crash of a ALI Douglas C47 at Milano airport.On 4 May 1949, a chartered Avio Linee Italiane G.212, carrying the Torino football first team squad, the Grande Torino, back home from a match in Lisbon, crashed into a hill at Superga, near Turin, killing all 31 aboard, including the 18 players.

New G.212s were also purchased by the Egyptian airline SAIDE, which received three aircraft in 1948, and the French airline Cie Air Transport. Four of the Avio Linee Italiane aircraft were sold to Ali Flotte Riunite, one of which was sold again to the Kuwaiti airline Arabian Desert Airlines.

As well as the G.212CA prototype, the Italian Air Force acquired six G.212CPs, two of which were converted to flying classrooms for training purposes as G.212AV (Aula Volante). One of these aircraft is preserved at the  Italian Air Force Museum at Vigna di Valle, near Rome.

Variants

G.212CA The first prototype of the G.212 family.
G.212CPThe first production series civil airliners.
G.212TP Freight transports for civil and military use.
G.212AV (Aula Volante) Navigation training aircraft; six G.212CPs fitted out as flying classrooms for the Italian Air Force.

Operators

Civil

SAIDE - Services Aériens Internationaux d'Egypte

 

Ali Flotte Riunite
Avio Linee Italiane

Arabian Desert Airlines

Military

 Italian Air Force operated 11 Fiat G.212 from 1949 until 1952

Specifications (G.212CP)

See also

References
Notes

Bibliography

 Donald, David, ed. The Encyclopedia of World Aircraft. Aerospace Publishing. 1997. .
 Stroud, John. "Post War Propliners: Fiat G.12 and G.212". Aeroplane Monthly, Volume 23 No. 1, January 1994, pp. 64–68. London: IPC.

External links

FIAT G.212
Fiat G.212 Airliners.net
Fiat G.212 (In Italian)

G.212
1940s Italian airliners
Trimotors
Low-wing aircraft
Aircraft first flown in 1947